The Schwäbisch Hall Unicorns are an American football team from Schwäbisch Hall, Germany.

The club's greatest successes were winning the southern division title in the German Football League in 2009 and in every season played since 2011 (as of 2021), and participated in every German Bowl held between 2011 and 2022 – except for 2013 and the 2020 season which was cancelled due to Covid-19, winning the title five times: in 2011, 2012, 2017, 2018 and in 2022. The club also made five losing appearances in the German Bowl, suffering defeat by record champion Braunschweig Lions in 2014, 2015, 2016 and 2019 and falling to the Dresden Monarchs in German Bowl XLII in 2021. Their 2011, 2017 and 2018 seasons also saw them post flawless perfect season records in the GFL on their way to championship rings. In 2016 and 2019 their only GFL losses came in the respective German Bowl at the hands of Braunschweig. In the Covid-truncated 2021 German Football League they also reached the German Bowl after posting a perfect regular season record (10–0) but lost again in the final, this time to the Dresden Monarchs. In 2021 the Unicorns also won their first ever European title, beating the Tyrol Raiders in the CEFL Bowl by a score of 22–16.

Previously, the only appearance in a national championship game the club has made was in 1997, when it lost the Junior Bowl to the youth team of the Berlin Adler.

History

Early years
The club was founded on 9 November 1983, as the American football department of the TSG Schwäbisch Hall, which is still, as of 2014, the mother club of the Unicorns.

In the following year, the team entered in the central division of the 2nd Bundesliga, the second tier of American football in Germany, now the German Football League 2. At this level, the club quickly acclimatised, winning its division in 1986 and 1987. In 1986, the Stuttgart Scorpions were still the stronger side in the promotion round, winning both games and baring the Unicorns from moving one level up, but the year after the club managed to take up the Scorpions place in the American Football Bundesliga.

The team played at this level for the next three seasons, without ever qualifying for the postseason, before losing its league place in 1990 when the league was reduced from 26 to 16 clubs. The Unicorns found themselves back in the 2nd Bundesliga for the next three seasons, before suffering further relegation.
 
The side's absolute low came in 1995, when it had dropped to the tier-four Oberliga Baden Württemberg, but it quickly recovered, winning the league that season and earning promotion to the third tier. After another title, now in the Regionalliga Mitte, the team returned to the 2nd Bundesliga once more for the 1997 season.

Back to the first tier
In four seasons at this level, the team finished in the top four each year, culminating in a second place in 2000, which allowed the side to move up again because of two clubs withdrawing from the GFL. For the next seven seasons, the Unicorns reached the play-offs each year, with a semi final appearance in 2005, where it lost to the Braunschweig Lions, as its best result.

The 2008 season was a disappointment to the club, finishing fifth in its division and missing the postseason, but also staying well clear of relegation trouble. In 2009, the Unicorns were much improved, winning the southern division for the first time and missing out on a first-ever German Bowl appearance by a point, losing 21–22 to the Kiel Baltic Hurricanes. In 2010, the club came second in its division but lost to the Dresden Monarchs in the quarterfinals of the play-offs.

Championships and continued success
The team played a flawless regular season in 2011, winning every game, followed by beating the Berlin Adler in the quarter finals and the Mönchengladbach Mavericks in the semifinals of the play-offs and advancing to the German Bowl for the first time, where they met the Kiel Baltic Hurricanes. The 33rd edition was the highest scoring German Bowl of all time, ending with a 48–44 victory for the Unicorns, which thereby ended an 18-year title drought for the south.

In 2012, the club once more won its division, reaching the German Bowl after victories over the Düsseldorf Panther and Berlin Adler in the quarter and semi finals of the play-offs. In a repeat of 2011 the club once more defeated the Kiel Baltic Hurricanes in the German Bowl. The 2013 season saw the club win a third consecutive division title but the team was unable to defend their national championship, being knocked out in the quarter finals by the Berlin Adler.

The club took out the southern division title of the GFL once more in 2014 and defeated the Kiel Baltic Hurricanes 50–24 in the quarter finals and the Dresden Monarchs 33–27 in the semi finals of the play-offs to reach the 2014 German Bowl where it lost to the New Yorker Lions in a lopsided 47–9 where they only managed to score a field goal until well into the fourth quarter. The team won the southern division for a fifth consecutive time in 2015 and defeated the Hamburg Huskies in the quarter finals and the Dresden Monarchs in the semi-finals of the play-offs, facing the New Yorker Lions once more in the German Bowl, which the Unicorns lost 31–41 in a much more closely fought contest than the previous year. 2015 also saw their first appearance in the BIG6 European Football League, where they advanced to the final before losing 24–14 in Eurobowl XXIX to host New Yorker Lions.

The 2016 season saw an unthreatened defense of the division championship with the Unicorns compiling a perfect season in the process. However, the division title and home field advantages throughout the playoffs could only be clinched in the last game with a 35–28 win at Frankfurt against Universe. On the European stage, Hall saw their BIG6 campaign stopped at the hands of the Tirol Raiders that beat them in the group phase after an easy win over the Berlin Adler. The post season began with an easy win over the Berlin Rebels (24–14) and continued – as the two years before – with a close fought match against the Dresden Monarchs. Despite a 21–7 lead going into halftime, the Unicorns only managed to put the game out of reach near the end ultimately prevailing 35–26 on a 100-yard kickoff return immediately following the Dresden field goal that had made it a close contest at 28–26. Thus Hall achieved the fifth bowl appearance in six years.

As of 2016, former Unicorn wide receiver Moritz Böhringer is the first and only European player to be drafted into the National Football League directly out of a European league.

In 2021 the Unicorns met the Tirol Raiders again. Since the BIG6 didn't exist anymore the two teams participated in the Central European Football League the new European top tournament and both teams made it to the bowl game. This time, the Unicorns managed to beat the Raiders and won their first European title. In the GFL, the team posted their fifth straight perfect regular season with a 10–0 record (the 2020 German Football League was not played due to Covid) in a season with a reduced schedule of only ten games instead of the usual 14. Beating their German Bowl rival Braunschweig in the quarterfinal in a game that opened in a sack by the Unicorns defense and saw an interception carried to a pick six in the opening drive by Italian-American Unicorns defender Cody Pastorino Hall defeated Braunschweig by 38–13 taking five turnovers from the Lions. The semifinal against the Potsdam Royals proved closer at 28–18 but its main importance was in the injuries to key players the Unicorns suffered - starting Quarterback Alexander Haupert (also the Quarterback of the Germany national American football team) was out with a knee injury and questionable for the final while starting running back John Santiago tore his ACL and was out for the rest of the season. In German Bowl XLII Hall would face another "familiar face" in their semifinal opponents from the 2014, 2015, 2016, 2018 and 2019 seasons, the Dresden Monarchs. Haupert, playing despite his injury, was knocked out of the game with a broken clavicle early in the second quarter, requiring Reilly Hennessey, who had just led  Parma Panthers to an Italian Bowl win that July, to step in under center in his first ever game in the German Football League. While the Unicorns led at the half 12–7 and once again had the turnover differential in their favor 2–1 their score early in the third quarter to make it 19–7 should prove their last and in the end Dresden won 28–19 with Hall failing to convert on a Field Goal attempt late in the game. Dresden thus celebrated their first playoff victory over the Unicorns since 2010, the first Championship for a team from the New States of Germany and dealt Hall their fifth German Bowl defeat in nine appearances and the first one not at the hands of Braunschweig. The Head Coach who led Dresden to their victory, Ulrich "Ulz" Däuber, was a Unicorns alumn himself, having played for them in the eighties and nineties and having been a coach in their youth system in the 1990s before an extended stint in the US.

Honours

International
 Central European Football League
 Champions: (2) 2021, 2022
 Eurobowl
 Runners-up: 2015
 BIG6 European Football League
 Participations: (2) 2015–2016
 EFL
 Participations: (2) 2012, 2013

National
 German Bowl
 Champions: (5) 2011, 2012, 2017, 2018, 2022
 Runners-up: (5) 2014–2016, 2019, 2021
 GFL
 Southern Division champions: (12) 2009, 2011–2019, 2021, 2022
 Play-off qualification: (20) 2001–2007, 2009–2019, 2021, 2022
 League membership: (24) 1988–1990, 2001–present
 GFL2
 Central Division champions: 1986, 1987
 Junior Bowl
 Champions: 2016
 Runners-up: 1997

German Bowl appearances
The club's appearances in the German Bowl:

Youth
The Unicorns are well known for their superb youth programmes and a significant number of their top players including national team quarterback Marco Ehrenfried have started playing with the Unicorns for one of their youth teams. The Unicorns also founded the first American Football only Sportinternat (sport focused boarding school) in Germany dubbed the "Unicorns Academy" in cooperation with the Evangelisches Schulzentrum Michelbach in Michelbach an der Bilz near Schwäbisch Hall.

Recent seasons
Recent seasons of the club:

 QF = Quarter finals.
 SF = Semi finals.
 GB = German Bowl
 † The final game of the 2011 season against the Marburg Mercenaries was not played because of heavy rain on game day.

Notable players
The team is notable for the long bonds between (former) players and the team with import players such as Nick Alfieri (who also runs a YouTube channel about his experiences in Germany) returning year after year and many members of the coaching staff - including head coach Jordan Neuman being former Unicorns players.
 David Bada, defensive lineman assigned to the Washington Football Team in 2020 as a member of the International Player Pathway Program.
 Moritz Böhringer, drafted in the sixth round of the 2016 NFL Draft by the Minnesota Vikings. Played for the Unicorns before and after his NFL stints.

References

External links
  Official website
  German Football League official website
  Football History Historic American football tables from Germany

American football teams in Germany
German Football League teams
American football teams established in 1983
Sport in Baden-Württemberg
1983 establishments in West Germany
Schwäbisch Hall